Malinga Maligaspe (born 20 June 1986) is a Sri Lankan cricketer. He made his first-class debut for Burgher Recreation Club in Tier B of the 2008–09 Premier League Tournament on 14 November 2008.

References

External links
 

1986 births
Living people
Sri Lankan cricketers
Burgher Recreation Club cricketers
Colombo Cricket Club cricketers
Kurunegala Youth Cricket Club cricketers
Sri Lanka Police Sports Club cricketers
Place of birth missing (living people)